Tom Coster (born August 21, 1941) is an American keyboardist, composer, and longtime backing musician for Carlos Santana.

Early years
Detroit-born and San Francisco-raised, Coster played piano and accordion as a youth, continuing his studies through college and a productive five-year stint as a musician in the U.S. Air Force Band.

Career
Coster has played with and/or composed for many groups and musicians including The Loading Zone, Gábor Szabó, Carlos Santana, Billy Cobham, Third Eye Blind, Coryell/Coster/Smith, Claudio Baglioni, Stu Hamm, Boz Scaggs, Zucchero and Bobby Holiday, Joe Satriani, Frank Gambale, and Vital Information. Coster also produced several solo jazz fusion recordings as a leader for Fantasy, Headfirst, and JVC.

Some of Coster's best-known compositions are "Europa (Earth's Cry Heaven's Smile)", "Flor D'Luna (Moonflower)" and "Dance, Sister, Dance (Baila Mi Hermana)" performed by Santana and "The Perfect Date" performed by Vital Information.

Personal life
Coster's son was born in 1966, also called Tom Coster, also a keyboardist and composer.

Solo discography and personnel

 T.C. (Fantasy, 1981)
 Tom Coster - keyboards, Linn-1 drum machine programming
 Joaquin Lievano - guitar
 Randy Jackson - bass
 Steve Smith - drums
 Ivory Expeditions (Fantasy, 1983)
 Tom Coster - keyboards
 Joaquin Lievano - guitar
 Randy Jackson - bass
 Steve Smith - drums
 Walter Afanasieff - additional keyboards
 Tommy Coster - additional keyboards
 Did Jah Miss Me?!? (Headfirst/JVC, 1989)
 Tom Coster - keyboards
 Tommy Coster - keyboards
 Jordan Rudess - keyboards
 Ernie Watts - alto, soprano and tenor saxophones, and Yamaha WX-7 wind driver
 Norbert Stachel - tenor saxophone
 Frank Gambale - acoustic and electric guitars
 Randy Jackson - electric bass
 Dennis Chambers - drums
 Steve Smith - drums
 Larry Grenadier - acoustic bass
 From Me to You (Headfirst/JVC, 1990)
 Tom Coster - keyboards
 Tommy Coster - keyboards
 Mark Russo - saxophones
 Corrado Rustci - guitar
 Kai-Eckhardt Karpeh - bass
 William Kennedy - drums
 Armando Peraza - congas, bongos
 Jimi Tunnell - vocals
 Gotcha (JVC, 1992)
 Tom Coster - keyboards, computer programming, synth and drum programming
 Mark Russo - saxophones
 Chris Camozzi - guitar
 Alphonso Johnson - electric and fretless bass
 Dennis Chambers - drums
 Norbert Stachel - saxophones
 Let's Set the Record Straight (JVC, 1993)
 Tom Coster - keyboards
 Bob Berg - saxophones
 Frank Gambale - acoustic and electric guitars
 Alphonso Johnson - electric and fretless bass
 Dennis Chambers - drums
 Raul Rekow - congas, bata, vocals
 Karl Perazzo - congas, bongos
 Steve Smith - drums
 Tommy Coster - Producer, keyboards and synth
 The Forbidden Zone (JVC, 1994)
 Tom Coster - keyboards, synthe bass
 Bob Berg - tenor saxophone
 Scott Henderson - guitars
 Jeff Andrews - electric bass
 Alphonso Johnson - electric and fretless bass
 Dennis Chambers - drums
 Raul Rekow - congas, bata, chekere, vocal chant
 Karl Perazzo - timbales, congas, miscellaneous percussion
 Tommy Coster - Producer
 Interstate '76 Soundtrack (w/Bullmark) (Activision, 1996)
 Tom Coster - keyboards
 Arion Salazar (Third Eye Blind) - electric bass
 Bryan Mantia (Primus) - drums & percussion
 Jon Bendich -
 Les Harris (Curveball) -
 Dave Schul (Curveball) -
 From the Street (JVC, 1996)
 Tom Coster - keyboards, synth bass
 Bob Malach - tenor saxophone
 Michael Brecker - tenor saxophone
 Dean Brown - rhythm guitar
 Steve Cardenas - lead guitar
 Dennis Chambers - drums
 Sheila E. - percussion
 Stu Hamm - electric bass
 Mark Isham - trumpet and cornet
 Tim Landers - electric and acoustic bass
 Tommy Coster - Producer

References

External links
All About Jazz
Vital Information Web Site

American jazz organists
American male organists
Santana (band) members
Keytarists
Living people
1941 births
Musicians from Detroit
Jazz musicians from Michigan
21st-century organists
American male jazz musicians
21st-century American keyboardists
Vital Information members
20th-century American keyboardists
Fantasy Records artists
JVC Records artists
United States Air Force Band musicians
United States military musicians